Narrandera, until around 1949 also spelled "Narandera", is a town located in the Riverina region of southern New South Wales, Australia.  The town lies on the junction of the Newell and Sturt highways, adjacent to the Murrumbidgee River, and it is considered the gateway to the Murrumbidgee Irrigation Area. At the 2016 census, Narrandera had a population of 3,746 people.

History

Narrandera is a river town with a rich heritage. Captain Charles Sturt is credited with being the first European to observe the area that later was to become known as Narrandera. However Sturt, who passed through the district on 12 December 1829, was not the first explorer to cast eyes on the Murrumbidgee River. The upper Murrumbidgee, the "Big Water", was first noted in April 1821 by Charles Throsby. The name Narrandera is derived from Wiradjuri nharrang, meaning "frill-necked lizard". and the name of the local Narrungderah Clan.

Massacre of Narrungderah people 
The local indigenous people of the Wiradjuri Nation, as noted were all but destroyed by settlement, disease brought by European settlers, and clashes with the settlers. The last blow was a massacre of the remainder of the Narrungderah Clan by a small group of European settlers near what is now referred to as Massacre, or Murdering Island, and is known to have left only one survivor. The people of the Wiradjuri nation who now reside in Narrandera make up ten percent of the population of the town, and predominantly came from the regions south and west of Narrandera, but were dis-located by colonial expansion.

Settlement 

In 1850, surveyor James Larmer reserved a site for what would later become Narrandera. The township developed in the early 1860s. Gillenbah post office opened nearby on 1 March 1859 and was replaced by the Narrandera office in 1861. A Gillenbah office was open from 1881 to 1892 and from 1906 to 1941.

The Borough of Narrandera was constituted by proclamation dated 17 March 1885, and gazetted the following day. The centenary of Local Government in Narrandera was celebrated in 1985.

1945 RAAF crash
On 3 September 1945, a Royal Australian Air Force Bristol Beaufighter assigned to No. 92 Squadron crashed into the canal at the western end of the town during a joy flight, killing all seven people on board.

2013 sesquicentenary 
A celebratory weekend event to mark Narrandera's sesquicentenary, named Back to Narrandera 1863 to 2013, was held in early October 2013. The Governor of New South Wales, Marie Bashir , who was born in Narrandera, opened the celebrations at a luncheon. During her speech of proclamation she acknowledged the indigenous custodians of the land, and noted that the name Narrandera is a Wiradjuri word for "the place of lizard or goanna".  Bashir informed the luncheon guests that 150 years ago 'on this site on the Murrumbidgee River, the beautiful place was officially proclaimed as a town named Narrandera'. Included on the program of events and activities for the celebrations were the Parkside Cottage Museum was open for most of the weekend and displayed many historical artefacts, including archival resources about the P.S. Wagga Wagga; the Murrumbidgee Sheepdog Championships were held; there were Narrandera Cemeteries Heritage Walks; a cocktail party; and a Chinese exhibition. There was also a Railway Memorabilia Display with Vintage Train Rides and the John O'Brien Heritage House was opened to the public; there was a vintage film evening; a classic ball; a Back to the 60's Dance; the Lions Club held a recovery breakfast; and a Ye Olde Town Picnic followed; with other events, including a CWA Devonshire Tea; a farmers' market; and a time capsule was sealed and placed under the Narrandera Clock Tower.  The new Rocky Waterholes Bridge was also opened.

Heritage listings 
Narrandera has a number of heritage-listed sites, including:
 Elizabeth Street: Narrandera Showground Industrial Hall
 Junee-Hay railway: Murrumbidgee River railway bridge
 Murrumbidgee River: Berembed Weir
 30-32 Twynam Street: Derrendi
 Whitton Street (Newell Highway): Narrandera railway station
 Murrumbidgee River near: Gogeldrie Weir

Narrandera today
The town of Narrandera is located adjacent to the Murrumbidgee River, at the intersection of the Newell Highway and the Sturt Highway at the centre of a diversely productive agricultural region. Its attractive tree-lined streets contrast with the open plains that surround it.

Narrandera now marks the transition between an extensive dry-land area devoted to cereal crops and sheep and wool production to the east, and, to the west, the Murrumbidgee Irrigation Area (MIA) fed by water from the Burrinjuck Dam. The MIA is a region where irrigation has opened the way to a diversity of enterprise, from the growing of rice and other cereals under irrigation to the production of citrus, wine grapes, potatoes, and increasingly, cotton and nuts.

The Narrandera Memorial Gardens include the unusual Hankinson Fountain. Manufactured by the Royal Doulton Company of England, the ceramic fountain is one of only two known to be in existence, the other located in Pakistan. It was given to the people of Narrandera by Alderman and Mrs Hankinson in 1922 in honour of locals who served in World War I.

Narrandera is known for its waterways described below, but in particular for the Lake Talbot Water Park. The waterpark is set in an amphitheatre of shaded lawns. The Water Park features a 50-metre pool, a large children's pool, an infants pool and a water playground as well two giant water-slides. It adjoins Lake Talbot, which is fed by the Bundidgerry Creek. The Lake is used by swimmers water-skiers and canoeists.

The Narrandera Flora and Fauna reserve is home to a Koala Regeneration Reserve. The reserve was set up in the 1970s to return Koalas to the town as they had been wiped out in the region by 1950 through accidental poisoning and through the fur export industry. There are now several hundred healthy Koala in the Reserve and they have bred and spread for many kilometres beyond Narrandera. Kangaroos are also well represented in the Reserve.

Narrandera's immediate surrounds feature a number of waterways, the major waterway being the Murrumbidgee River. Others include Lake Talbot, the Narrandera Wetlands, Bundidgerry Creek, and the ephemeral Lake Coolah.

The town also has number of historic features, such as a fig tree on the corner of King and Cadell Streets, which is thought to be 150 years old; and the Mon Repos, a residence built in a Queen Anne-style, which was built in the 1890s. The Oakbank Brewery Tower located beside the Murrumbidgee on Oakbank Road is a prominent feature, once owned by Lincolns brewers, then by Oakbank Brewery. Its last productive days were as a cordial (soft drink) factory owned by the Webster family of Narrandera.

Narrandera Parkside Museum houses a cloak made from the first bale of Merino wool sent back to England by the MacArthur family.

The Irrigation Canal which flows through the town carries water to the Murrumbidgee Irrigation Area to Narrandera's west. The canal follows the natural bed of Bundidgerry Creek and in places spreads wide and has no levee banks. Lake Talbot was formed in 1924 when the bank of the Irrigation Canal gave way, flooding the river flat between the canal and Bundidgerry Hill. The shallow body of water was allowed to remain and became an important recreational feature of the town. A wetland has been created off Lizard Drive, only  from the Murrumbidgee River. The Wetland acts as a collection point for storm water run-off from the town.

Demography 
Like many rural localities in the area, the population level has progressively declined over a number of years, evidenced as follows:

Climate
Narrandera has a semi-arid climate, with precipitation being just below a humid subtropical climate under the formula used the Köppen climate classification.

Transport

Narrandera is well served for transport. The Sturt Highway and the Newell Highway cross just south of Narrandera.

Narrandera is served by a twice-weekly NSW TrainLink Xplorer service operating between Sydney and Griffith. NSW TrainLink also operate a road coach service from Wagga Wagga to Griffith via Coolamon.

Sports
Narrandera has a rugby league team competing in the Group 17 competition. Known colloquially as the Lizards, the club were disbanded, leaving Group 20 in 2005. This left the town with no rugby league club from 2006-2011 and 2015-17. After briefly amalgamating with neighbouring club Yanco-Wamoon to form Bidgee Hurricanes (2012–14), the club reformed independently in 2018 and joined the reformed Group 17. The club has three premierships from their time in Group 20 (1986, 1991, 1999) and one from Group 17 in 2022, which broke a 23-year drought.

The Narrandera Eagles (formerly and still officially Narrandera Imperials Football Club) compete in the Riverina Football League, winning premierships in 1986 and 2012. Formerly of the South West competition, the club won 15 titles in that league.

Narrandera also has strong local cricket and basketball competitions.

Notable residents
 Dame Marie Bashir, a former Governor of New South Wales
 Percy Bushby (1919-1975) was an Australian Rules footballer who played for Essendon in the VFL between 1936 and 1948.
 Daniel Christian, a former Australian ODI/T20 International cricketer 
 Creswell Eastman , endocrinologist, professor of medicine, known for Iodine Deficiency Disorders research.
 Adrian Feint Australian artist, noted for paintings of flowers and bookplates
 Matt Flynn, Australian rules footballer
 Kathleen Gorham, a prima ballerina
 Sam Groth, a professional tour tennis player
 Patrick Hartigan, a Catholic priest, poet and author who used the pen name, "John O'Brien": the bush ethos celebrated by Hartigan in his writings has been commemorated in the once annual John O'Brien Bush Festival.
 Cliff Lyons, a former professional rugby league footballer who represented Manly Sea Eagles, the NSW and Australian teams
 Tim Ruffles, a former Australian rules footballer
 Zac Williams, an Australian Rules footballer, who plays for the GWS Giants
 Stan Grant Snr, AM, a Wiradjuri elder and author who has played a central role in the preservation of the Wiradjuri language

In popular culture
The novel Jessica, by Bryce Courtenay, mentions Narrandera several times as the main town near the place where the book is set.

Gallery

References

External links

Narrandera Tourism Information
Narrandera -VisitNSW.com

 
Towns in the Riverina
Towns in New South Wales
Populated places on the Murrumbidgee River
Newell Highway
Narrandera Shire